Arbelodes dupreezi is a moth in the family Cossidae. It is found in Namibia, where it has been recorded from the Karas Region. The habitat consists of montane desert shrublands.

The length of the forewings is about 14 mm. The forewings are glossy dark olive-grey, but buffy brown along the costa. There is an ivory yellow patch edged by buffy brown at the end of the cell. The hindwings are glossy dark olive-grey.

Etymology
The species is named for Peter du Preez.

References

Natural History Museum Lepidoptera generic names catalog

Endemic fauna of Namibia
Moths described in 2010
Metarbelinae